Variant Chinese characters (Hepburn: itaiji; ; Revised Romanization: icheja) are Chinese characters that are homophones and synonyms. Most variants are allographs in most circumstances, such as casual handwriting. Some contexts require the usage of certain variants, such as in textbook editing.

Regional standards

Variant Chinese characters exist within and across all regions where Chinese characters are used, whether Chinese-speaking (mainland China, Hong Kong, Macau, Taiwan, Singapore), Japanese-speaking (Japan), or Korean-speaking (North Korea, South Korea). Some of the governments of these regions have made efforts to standardize the use of variants, by establishing certain variants as standard. The choice of which variants to use has resulted in some divergence in the forms of Chinese characters used in mainland China, Hong Kong, Japan, Korea and Taiwan. This effect compounds with the sometimes drastic divergence in the standard Chinese character sets of these regions resulting from the character simplifications pursued by mainland China and by Japan.

The standard character forms of each region are described in:
The Table of General Standard Chinese Characters for mainland China
The List of Graphemes of Commonly-Used Chinese Characters for Hong Kong
The Standard Form of National Characters for Taiwan
The list of Jōyō kanji for Japan
The Kangxi Dictionary (de facto) for Korea

Origins of variants
Character forms that are most orthodox are known as orthodox variants, which is sometimes taken as homonymous to Kangxi Dictionary forms, as the forms found in the Kangxi dictionary are usually the ones consider to be orthodox, at least by late Imperial China standards. Variants that differ from the orthodox form, mainly used in informal situations, are known as folk variants (Revised Romanization: sokja; Hepburn: zokuji). Some of these are longstanding abbreviations or alternate forms that became the basis for the Simplified Character set promulgated by the People's Republic of China. For example,  is the folk variant, whereas  is the orthodox form, of the character meaning 'foolish, obsessive'. In this case, two different phonetic elements were chosen to represent the same sound. In other cases, the differences between the orthodox form and popular form are merely minor distinctions in the length or location of strokes, whether certain strokes cross, or the presence or absence of minor inconspicuous strokes (dots). These are often not considered true variant characters but are adoptions of different standards for character shape. In mainland China, these are called xin zixing (typically a simplified popular form) and jiu zixing (typically the Kangxi dictionary form). For instance,  is the new form of the character with traditional orthography  'recount; describe'. As another example,  'a surname; name of an ancient state' is the 'new character shape' form of the character traditionally written .

Variant graphs also sometimes arise during the historical processes of liding (lit. 'clerical fixing') and libian (lit. 'clerical changing'). Libian was the natural evolving process of the seal script into the clerical script, which often involved significant omissions, additions, or transmutations of graphical form, while liding is the direct regularization and linearization of shapes to convert them into clerical forms while also preserving the original structure. For instance, the small seal script character for 'year' was converted by liding to a clerical script form that led to the variant , while the same character, after undergoing libian, gave rise to a clerical script form that eventually became the orthodox .

There are variants that arise through the use of different radicals to refer to specific definitions of a polysemous character. For instance, the character  could mean either 'certain types of hawk' or 'carve; engrave.' For the former, the variant  ('bird' radical) is sometimes employed, while for the latter, the variant  ('jade' radical) is sometimes used.

The two characters formerly belonged to two different Old Chinese rime groups ( and  groups, respectively) and could not possibly have had the same pronunciation back then.

Usage in computing

Unicode deals with variant characters in a complex manner, as a result of the process of Han unification. In Han unification, some variants that are nearly identical between Chinese-, Japanese-, Korean-speaking regions are encoded in the same code point, and can only be distinguished using different typefaces. Other variants that are more divergent are encoded in different code points. On web pages, displaying the correct variants for the intended language is dependent on the typefaces installed on the computer, the configuration of the web browser and the language tags of web pages. Systems that are ready to display the correct variants are rare because many computer users do not have standard typefaces installed and the most popular web browsers are not configured to display the correct variants by default. The following are some examples of variant forms of Chinese characters with different code points and language tags.

The following are some examples of variant forms of Chinese characters with the same code points and different language tags.

Graphemic variants
Some variants are not allographic.

See also
 Ryakuji
 Han unification
Z-variant

External links
Dictionary of Chinese Character Variants

Chinese characters